Balkedan (also Romanized as Balkedān) is a village in Seydun-e Jonubi Rural District, Seydun District, Bagh-e Malek County, Khuzestan Province, Iran. At the 2006 census, its existence was noted, but Balkedan's population was not reported at all.

References 

Populated places in Bagh-e Malek County